Jaak Roosaare (also Kaarel Jaak Roosaare; born 19 July 1954 New York, USA) is an Estonian politician. He was a member of VII Riigikogu.

References

Living people
1954 births
Estonian National Independence Party politicians
People's Union of Estonia politicians
Conservative People's Party of Estonia politicians
Members of the Riigikogu, 1992–1995
University of Washington alumni